Audioslave is an eponymous DVD EP by American rock supergroup Audioslave, released in 2003. It contains the three music videos the band had made up to that point: "Cochise", directed by Mark Romanek, "Like a Stone", directed by Meiert Avis, and "Show Me How to Live", directed by Richard C. Sarafian. After the music videos is a block of material taken from Late Show with David Letterman in New York City on November 25, 2002. This consists of one-on-one interviews and two live performances on a public street ("Set It Off", and "Gasoline"), plus behind-the-scenes footage. The DVD was certified Gold by the RIAA in 2004.

Chapter listing
"Cochise"
"Like a Stone"
"Show Me How to Live"
"Set It Off" (live)
"Gasoline" (live)

Personnel
Chris Cornell – vocals
Tom Morello – guitar
Tim Commerford – bass guitar
Brad Wilk – drums

Video directors
Meiert Avis
Mark Romanek
Richard C. Sarafian

Certifications and sales

References

Audioslave video albums
2003 video albums
Music video compilation albums
2003 compilation albums